Fatma Emetullah Sultan (1679, Edirne or Constantinople - 13 December 1700, Constantinople) was a ottoman princess, the daughter of Mehmed IV and his Haseki Emetullah Rabia Gülnuş Sultan. She was the sister of Sultans Mustafa II and Ahmed III.

Early life 
She was born between in 1679 circa at Edirne Palace or Topkapi Palace, to Mehmed IV and his favorite and Haseki Emetullah Rabia Gülnuş Sultan. Her second name was given in honor of her mother. She was the sixth and last child of her parents and the fourth daughters.

Marriages
Her brother, Mustafa II, married her to Tırnakçı Çerkes Ibrahim Pasha on September 1695; whom he first granted the rank of deputy of Silistre, then later executed, in September 1697. They had a daughter. 

She subsequently married Topal Yusuf Paşa in 1697. They had a daughter.

Issue 
By her first marriage, Fatma had a daughter:

 Rukiye Hanimsultan (1696 - 1720, before August), who married Sirke Osman Pasha. After her death, he married her cousin Emetullah Sultan. 

By her second marriage, Fatma had a second daughter:

 Safiye Hanimsultan (1697/1700 - 1711).

Death 
Fatma Sultan died on December 13, 1700, from plague, tuberculosis, or according to other sources, postpartum complications. During the funeral, she was accompanied by a procession of statesmen together with her husband. She was buried in the Turhan Sultan Mosque, in the her paternal grandmother, next to her father.

References 

1680 births
1700 deaths